24A may refer to:

 M-24A (Michigan highway)
 South Dakota Highway 24A
 AAA battery's American National Standards Institute technical designation

See also
 A24 (disambiguation)